John Pitts  (also Pits, Pitseus) (1560 – 17 October 1616) was an English Roman Catholic scholar and writer.

Life
Pitts was born in Alton, Hampshire in 1560 and attended Winchester College. From 1578 to 1580 he studied at New College, Oxford. In 1581 he was admitted to the English College, Rome.

In 1588 he was ordained priest, and became professor at the English College, Reims. He then graduated Lic.D. at Trier (1592) and D.D. at Ingolstadt (1595). He became Canon at Verdun, then confessor and almoner to the Duchess of Cleves; after her death he became Dean of Liverdun. He died in Liverdun, Lorraine.

Work
 Relationum Historicarum de rebus Angliæ in four parts:
 De Illustribus Angliæ Scriptoribus, published in Paris in 1619
 De Regibus Angliæ
 De Episcopis Angliæ
 De Viris Apostolicis Angliæ
 (the last three parts remained in manuscript in Liverdun)
 Tractatus de legibus, published in Trier in 1592
 Tractatus de beatitudine, published in Ingolstadt in 1595
 Libri septem de peregrinatione published in Düsseldorf in 1604

References
 
  

1560 births
1616 deaths
People from Alton, Hampshire
People educated at Winchester College
University of Ingolstadt alumni
16th-century English Roman Catholic priests
17th-century English Roman Catholic priests